Kuoni Travel is a tourism company, operating various services including charter and scheduled passenger airlines, package holidays, cruise lines, and hotels in destinations around the world across nine different geographic regions.

The company specialises in luxury and tailor-made travel for both business and consumer markets, as well as related services such as visa processing. In 2013, the Kuoni Group was named “World’s Leading Luxury Tour Operator” at the annual World Travel Awards.

History

Kuoni was founded in 1906 by the entrepreneur Alfred Kuoni in Zurich, Switzerland, where the firm has continued to be based. Over time, Kuoni grew to be the biggest travel company in Switzerland. During 1965, Kuoni established a base in the United Kingdom by purchasing Challis and Benson in London’s Bond Street; over time, Kuoni became the leading long-haul tour operator in the British market.

In 1966, Peter Diethelm established the Kuoni UK tour operation. During 1970, Kuoni introduced the country's first charter flight to the Far East. In 1974, the company took over Houlders World Holidays and relocated its tour operation to new headquarters in Dorking, Surrey, after which it launched a long-haul tour programme. During 1980, Kuoni adopted a computerised reservations system, which the firm has credited with dramatically improving both the speed and flexibility of tailor-making its holidays. In 1981, Kuoni introduced its first batch of summer holidays to Switzerland.
  
During 1983, Kuoni was awarded the first Travel Weekly award for Britain’s Best Longhaul Tour Operator. In 1984, after reaching an arrangement with national flag carrier British Airways, the company operated the first chartered Concorde flight, which was flown to the Caribbean. During 1987, Kuoni offered the first round-the-world holiday by Concorde; that same year, it introduced the first charter flight to the Maldives. In 1988, the company launched the KUDOS reservations system for travel agents, increasing the flexibility of its holiday packages. During 1992, Kuoni is the first travel company to receive both the TTG and Travel Weekly Best Longhaul Operator award for 10 years in a row.

During 1998, Kuoni acquired Voyages Jules Verne; it also won its first ever award for ‘World’s Best Tour Operator’ at the World Travel Awards that year. In 1999, the company became the first British tour operator to offer an internet-based booking facility. In 2000, a collection of "handpicked" holidays, branded as Kuoni World Class was launched. In 2006 the firm acquired Journeys of Distinction and Kirker Holidays.
  
During 2007, Kuoni was voted as the Travel Weekly’s Best Longhaul Tour Operator for the 25th year and the Daily Mail’s Favourite Longhaul Tour Operator. In 2008, the company also acquired the luxury travel company Carrier. During 2009, Kuoni received a number of awards, including Favourite Family Tour Operator at the Sunday Times Travel Magazine Awards. Between 2009 and 2011, the company opened up new stores in various UK locations. In 2011, the Kuoni Explore magazine was launched, as well as a collection of "responsible tourism" holidays, branded Ananea.

During 2012, Kuoni formed an arrangement with department store John Lewis to become its exclusive travel partner, under which new stores were opened in various branches of John Lewis, including Southampton, London’s Oxford Street, Reading and Cardiff. In 2013, the company's first television advert was broadcast in the UK; the Stay & Cruise holidays brand was also launched and additional outlets opened at John Lewis stores in Leicester, Brent Cross, Aberdeen and Welwyn Garden City. During 2014, Kuoni was selected as one of the Sunday Times’ 100 Best Companies to Work For in the mid-sized category, while a new website for the company was launched that year.

Corporate structure

Following a corporate restructuring in the late 2000s, and at the end of 2015, Kuoni consists of three central divisions:

 GTS (Global Travel Services), B2B offerings
 GTD (Global Travel Distribution, B2B offering consisting of Fully Independent Travel (FIT) service
 VFS Services, B2G offering visa processing services to governments

Kuoni UK 
Kuoni is part of DER Touristik (part of the German REWE Group) and is based in Dorking, Surrey, England. Kuoni UK has been in the premium long-haul tour operating business since 1966, following the acquisition of Challis & Benson Ltd. The Kuoni UK group also includes:

 Voyages Jules Verne (now trading as Jules Verne)
 CV Villas
 Kirker Holidays
 Carrier
 Journey Latin America
 Kuoni Retail

Kuoni UK has a network 48 retail stores including 15 located in John Lewis retail stores.

See also

References

External links 
 Official Group Site
 History of Kuoni

Companies based in Surrey
Travel and holiday companies of Switzerland
Travel and holiday companies of the United Kingdom